The Ussuri sharpbelly (Hemiculter lucidus) is a temperate freshwater fish belonging to the subfamily Cultrinae of the family Cyprinidae. It originates in the Amur River basin in Asia.  It was originally described as Culter lucidus by B. I. Dybowski in 1872, and has also been referred to as Hemiculter leucisculus lucidus in scientific literature.

The fish reaches a size up to 25.0 cm (9.8 in) long, and a weight of 70.0 g (2.5 oz).

References 

 

Hemiculter
Freshwater fish of China
Fish of Russia
Cyprinid fish of Asia
Fish described in 1872